Le Val-d'Hazey is a commune in the department of Eure, northern France. The municipality was established on 1 January 2016 by merger of the former communes of Aubevoye, Sainte-Barbe-sur-Gaillon and Vieux-Villez.

Population

See also 
Communes of the Eure department

References 

Communes of Eure
Populated places established in 2016
2016 establishments in France